Blosser is an extinct town in Saline County, in the U.S. state of Missouri.

A post office called Blosser was established in 1891, and remained in operation until 1911. The community has the name of E. J. Blosser, the original owner of the town site.

References

Ghost towns in Missouri
Former populated places in Saline County, Missouri